Navy House is the official residence of the Commander of the Sri Lanka Navy in Colombo. The present Navy House is a Class “A” type quarters constructed by the British Colonial Government of Ceylon to house government officials along Bullers Road. It is located next door to the General's House.

See also
Navy House, Trincomalee

External links
 Columns - Political Column

Official residences in Sri Lanka
Installations of the Sri Lanka Navy
Houses in Colombo